Brigadier General Vivian Telford Bailey,  CMG, DSO (1869–1938) was an Irish-born commander of the British Army in World War I.

Life
Bailey was born in Dublin in 1869.

He was commissioned into the British Army as a second lieutenant in The King's Liverpool Regiment on 17 January 1891, and was promoted to lieutenant on 1 November 1893. Promoted to captain on 21 March 1900, he was appointed adjutant of the 3rd battalion of his regiment one week later on 28 March 1900. He served in South Africa during the Second Boer War (1899–1902), and did not return to the United Kingdom until after the end of the war, leaving Cape Town on the SS Orient in October 1902.

In the First World War he began as a lieutenant colonel in the Liverpool Regiment. By 1917 he rose to Brigadier General and commanded the 142nd Infantry Brigade (6th London Brigade). He fought at Messines Ridge in 1917. He was wounded at Delville Wood, one of the 146 British generals who were wounded in the First World War.

He retired to Tantallon Lodge east of North Berwick.

He died in 1938 and is buried with his wife in North Berwick Cemetery.

Family
In 1908 he married Mirabel Stuart Towers-Clark (1882-1979), and the following year they were living in Farnham in Surrey. Their son John Vivian Bailey was born in 1909. He was a Major in the Royal Scots Fusiliers but was killed in action in 1943 in Sicily.

References

1869 births
1938 deaths
Military personnel from Dublin (city)
British Army brigadiers
British Army generals of World War I
King's Regiment (Liverpool) officers
Companions of the Distinguished Service Order
British Army personnel of the Second Boer War